The 1990 Richmond upon Thames Borough Council election took place on 3 May 1990 to elect members of Richmond upon Thames London Borough Council in London, England. The whole council was up for election and the Liberal Democrats (successors of the SDP–Liberal Alliance) stayed in overall control of the council.

Background

Election result

Ward results

References

1990
1990 London Borough council elections